Redwall is a series of children's fantasy novels by British writer Brian Jacques, published from 1986 to 2011. It is also the title of the first book of the series, published in 1986, as well as the name of the abbey featured in the book, and is the name of an animated TV series based on three of the novels (Redwall, Mattimeo, and Martin the Warrior), which first aired in 1999. The books are primarily aimed at adolescents. There have been 22 novels and two picture books published. The twenty-second, and final, novel, The Rogue Crew, was posthumously released on 3 May 2011, almost three months after Jacques' death on 5 February.

Overview

The series chronicles the adventures of the anthropomorphic animals inhabiting Redwall Abbey and the surrounding countryside of Mossflower Wood, including mice, moles, hares, badgers, and other woodland species. Frequently the peace-loving creatures of Mossflower are called upon to become warriors to defend themselves from marauding bands of "vermin" such as rats, weasels, and foxes.

The novels in the series are set in many periods in the fictional history of Redwall and Mossflower; the chronological order of the stories is not the same as the order in which they were written, some taking place before the construction of Redwall Abbey itself or in far-flung locations beyond Mossflower. Some of the books focus on characters who, in other volumes, are legendary historical figures, such as The Legend of Luke. Because of the widely spaced storylines, very few characters are mentioned in more than one or two novels. One notable exception is Martin the Warrior, one of the founders of Redwall Abbey, whose adventures are chronicled in several of the novels and who is frequently mentioned as an icon of heroism who inspires later Redwall denizens, occasionally appearing to them as a spiritual vision.

Despite the changing historical setting and absence of recurring characters, familiar character archetypes recur throughout the books, often characters in tribe-specific leadership roles, such the Badger Lords, the Skipper of Otters, or the shrew tribe leader "Log-a-Log". Other recurring elements include "Dibbuns" (the Redwall name for infant woodlanders) and detailed descriptions of food.

Although the main setting is an abbey, and several characters are referred to as monks, friars, etc., the series makes little mention of religious beliefs or practices. Early novels establish a St. Ninian's church near Redwall Abbey, but a later novel portrays that as a misnomer for a building that was never a church.

The  Redwall novels are characterized as fantasy, but contain little in the way of magic or the supernatural, apart from the anthropomorphism of the animal characters. The sword of Martin the Warrior is believed by many characters to be magical, and vermin occasionally try to steal it for this reason; Mossflower reveals that it was forged from a fragment of a meteorite at the volcanic fortress Salamandastron by the Badger Lord known as Boar the Fighter. The role of "monsters" in the novels is played not by mythical creatures, but by real-world predators such as adders, sharks, and wolverines.

Books

At the time of Jacques' death, twenty-one novels had been released. The Sable Quean was released in February 2010. The twenty-second and (because of his death) final book, The Rogue Crew, was released on 3 May 2011.

The prequels to Redwall are not released in any chronological order. The sequels, including Mattimeo, were released in the order in which they occur. The books are listed below in their chronological order within the fictional world of Redwall, with publication dates noted.

The first three chronologically ordered books (Lord Brocktree, Martin the Warrior, and Mossflower) take place before the construction of Redwall Abbey, while the fourth, The Legend of Luke, takes place during its construction. Many of the books that take place before Redwall was constructed are told via a framing device.

Most books adjacent to each other in chronological order take place within a generation or so of each other, as evidenced by mentions of past characters in the later books. Redwall and  Mattimeo as well as  Mariel of Redwall and The Bellmaker feature the same cast, with a short span of time between them. From Triss onward, however, they take place so far apart in time that none share any characters with other books anymore.

Characters
In the Redwall universe, species almost invariably (with very few exceptions, including change of character mid-story) determines a creature's nature, whether good or evil. Some common noble species in Redwall include mice, otters, moles, hares, squirrels, hedgehogs, shrews, birds, voles, and badgers, while common vermin include rats, foxes, weasels, ferrets, ravens, snakes, stoats, ermine, sables, wildcats, magpies, rooks, and crows. However, many other varieties of species also make appearances throughout the novels as well. Dormice also appear sometimes but are rarely major characters. On numerous occasions it mentions seals, whose language makes little sense to other creatures; also bank voles on numerous occasions, usually as a "good" character but once as an evil character. Twice, in Mattimeo and Loamhedge, there is a creature, apparently half weasel and half ferret, called a Wearet, while the book The Rogue Crew features a (purportedly) half-weasel and half-rat Wearat as its principal villain. Pine martens have been featured in three books, once as the main villain and twice in the service of a wildcat. Several reptiles are also mentioned, such as adders, other snakes, and lizards. Amphibians like toads and frogs have been featured also, and are depicted as lower creatures that live in more basic tribal systems and usually serve not as the primary villains but as secondary distractions to heroes. Pikes can be found throughout the books, inhabiting rivers, and also acting as a secondary distraction. Sharks have been known to attack ships, one instance can be found in Triss. There are also some creatures that have only been mentioned once or twice (e.g., wolf, beaver, turtle, whale, wolverine, sable, tortoise, golden hamster, bats, monitor lizards, polecats, and in the first book horses, pigs, dogs and cows). Crows and other Corvus birds also appear on numerous occasions, usually being vicious and territorial. Other birds such as owls, herons, red-tailed hawks, and eagles are mentioned, some having major parts in books, including in Mattimeo when a raven named General Ironbeak manages to invade and almost conquers Redwall Abbey with his army of rooks.  In Martin the Warrior, a group of squirrels called the Gawtrybe are presented as villains, though squirrels are usually considered "good" and the Gawtrybe end up aiding the heroes during the final battle.

Locations
The books are centered around Redwall Abbey, a red sandstone abbey built after the events of Mossflower. It is home to many of the good animals of Mossflower Woods. Also important is the mountain fortress called Salamandastron, home to the Badger Lords and the famed hares of the Long Patrol, the mountain's army. There are many other places, such as the fortress Riftgard, Loamhedge, and Green Isle. Also, a main waterway is the River Moss. Other stories, like The Bellmaker and The Legend of Luke, most of the story takes place onboard sailing ships and many dangers are only those involving the weather and damage resulting from such.

There are also the far northern lands; much of the wildlife in the books from those lands are those native to Scotland specifically, such as pine martens and golden eagles. As well as the northern lands, there are islands featured in the series; usually, each island is featured in one book only.

Literary significance and reception
Brian Jacques was praised for his Redwall series. He was called one of "the best children's authors in the world". The books of the Redwall series have drawn comparisons from J. R. R. Tolkien’s The Lord of the Rings to Kenneth Grahame's The Wind in the Willows to Erin Hunter's Warriors and Richard Adams's Watership Down. Jacques combines "action, poetry, songs, courage, and vivid descriptions" to create a unique style that spans the seemingly endless series.

The Redwall series has received praise for its "equal-opportunity adventuring, in which female creatures can be just as courageous (or as diabolical) as their male counterparts". Novels such as Mariel of Redwall, Pearls of Lutra, High Rhulain and Triss all feature strong female leading characters. Jacques has also received acclaim for his development of unique language intrinsic to certain species, giving the novels an "endearing dialectal dialogue".

Some reviews have been critical of the Redwall novels for providing too simplistic a view of good and evil. The characteristics of the animals in the novels are fixed by their species, making them quite "predictable", though there have been a few books, such as in Outcast of Redwall and Pearls of Lutra, in which vermin have acted selflessly, in one taking a spear through the chest and back meant for his former nursemaid, and in the other saving the Abbot of Redwall from lizards. Another exception is in The Bellmaker, where a searat strove to start being good instead of evil, abandoning his life of pirating to live by himself. In some cases, different members of the same species possess different moral compasses. For example, the wildcats in the book Mossflower each exhibit different characteristics: although Lady Tsarmina is cruel and vicious, her father Lord Verdauga is seen as hard but fair, and her brother Gingivere is kind and eventually joins the side of the woodlanders. As a general rule though, characters tend to "epitomize their class origins", rarely rising above them.

Many reviewers have also criticized the Redwall series for repetition and predictability, citing "recycled" plot lines and Jacques' tendency to follow a "pattern to the dot". Other reviewers note that such predictable "ingredients" may be what "makes the Redwall recipe so consistently popular". Although the series did not continue to break new ground, it does provide satisfying adventures with "comforting, predictable conclusions for its fans".

Illustrators

The last interior artist was Sean Rubin. Prior to Rubin taking over in 2009, David Elliot illustrated six books in the Redwall series, including Eulalia!, published in 2007. Elliot also illustrated the anniversary edition of Mossflower, with full page illustrations. Other previous interior illustrators include Gary Chalk (Redwall, Mariel of Redwall, and Martin the Warrior), Allan Curless (The Bellmaker to The Long Patrol), Chris Baker (Marlfox to Lord Brocktree) and Peter Standley (The Taggerung). The cover artist of the US editions of the novels is Troy Howell. Pete Lyon and Douglas Hall provided cover art for different UK editions of the first four books. Later, Chris Baker became the UK cover artist up until the release of Triss, when David Wyatt took over.

Adaptations

International editions

Books in the Redwall series have been translated into Arabic, Bulgarian, Czech, Danish, Dutch, Finnish, French, German, Greek, Hebrew, Hungarian, Italian, Japanese, Latvian, Norwegian, Polish, Russian, Serbian, Spanish, and Swedish.

Television series and films

The first season of the Redwall television series, released in 1999, was based upon the novel Redwall. It was later followed by two more seasons, based on the books Mattimeo and Martin the Warrior.  Each season contained 13 episodes. Each episode was opened with Brian Jacques himself giving a synopsis of the story so far. These scenes were later cut from subsequent re-airings and DVD releases.

In February 2021, Netflix acquired full adaptation rights to the novel series. A feature film based on the novel Redwall and an animated "event series" based on the character Martin the Warrior are in the works for the streaming platform. Patrick McHale, creator of Over the Garden Wall, will be writing the film's script. Due to changes at Netflix in December 2022 however, McHale is no longer working on the feature film.

Audiobooks

There have been full-length audiobooks published of most of the Redwall books, the exceptions being The Pearls of Lutra, Marlfox, Lord Brocktree (on cassette), The Legend of Luke, and The Rogue Crew. Instead of being read by a single actor, the novels are narrated by a large cast. Brian Jacques served as the narrator for almost all of the audiobooks (with Salamandastron being the sole exception), sometimes reading select parts, and his son Marc Jacques appeared as the characters Matthias, Martin and others. The audiobooks also feature fully-realized musical performances of the songs that each book contains, composed and performed by Billy Maher.

Some abridged audiobooks have also been released. They include Redwall, Mossflower, Pearls of Lutra, The Long Patrol, Marlfox, The Legend of Luke and Lord Brocktree. Each is three hours in length and read solely by Brian Jacques or another narrator.

Opera

In 1996, Evelyn Swenson composed an opera based on the first book in the Redwall series. It was produced by OperaDelaware in Wilmington, Delaware and later toured Europe.

Games
There are currently two officially-licensed video games based on the Redwall series. Both games were created by Soma Games under the banner of The Lost Legends of Redwall.

Other Redwall-related books
 The Great Redwall Feast (1996) (picture book)
 Redwall Map & Riddler (1998)
 Redwall Friend & Foe (2000)
 A Redwall Winter's Tale (2001) (picture book)
 Tribes of Redwall Badgers (2001)
 Tribes of Redwall Otters (2002)
 Tribes of Redwall Mice (2003)
 The Redwall Cookbook (2005)
 The Redwall Graphic Novel (2007)

References

External links
 
The Redwall Wiki

Redwall
Novels about animals
Fantasy books by series